Black Arrow is  a British satellite carrier rocket.

Black Arrow may also refer to:

 The Black Arrow: A Tale of the Two Roses, an 1888 novel by Robert Louis Stevenson
 Black Arrow (serial), a 1944 Columbia film serial
 The Black Arrow (film), a 1948 film starring Louis Hayward
 Black Arrow (1985 film), a Disney television movie
 Zastava M93 Black Arrow, a Serbian sniper rifle manufactured by Zastava Arms
 Operation Black Arrow, an Israeli military operation carried out in Gaza on 28 February 1955
 The Black Arrow: A Tale of the Resistance, a 2005 novel by Vin Suprynowicz
 Black Arrow (Middle-earth), a fictional Middle-earth weapon in The Hobbit

See also
 Black Arrows
 Arrow (disambiguation)
 Blue Arrow (disambiguation)
 Golden Arrow (disambiguation)
 Green Arrow (disambiguation)
 Pink Arrow (disambiguation)
 Red Arrow (disambiguation)
 Silver Arrow (disambiguation)
 White Arrow (disambiguation)
 Yellow Arrow (disambiguation)